The Kuyto are three lakes in the Republic of Karelia, in the northwestern part of Russia. The Kuyto lakes are connected by natural canals, and are used for timber rafting.
It has an area of 198 km², surface elevation of 103 m and a maximum depth of 44 m.

Lower Kuyto terminates at a dam built in 1956, below which flows the Kem River.

There are numerous islands on Kuyto Lakes.

Lakes of the Republic of Karelia
Lake groups of Russia
LKuyto